Ted Hall may refer to:
 Ted Hall (footballer) (1876–1903), Australian rules footballer
 Theodore Hall (1925–1999), American physicist and atomic spy for the Soviet Union

See also
Teddy Hall (disambiguation)
Edward Hall (disambiguation)